The 31st King's Cup finals were held from 20 to 27 February 2000 at the Rajamangala Stadium in Bangkok, Thailand. The King's Cup (คิงส์คัพ) is an annual football tournament; the first tournament was played in 1968.

Hosts Thailand won the tournament beating Finland 5–1 in the final.

Venue
All matches held at the Rajamangala Stadium in Bangkok, Thailand

Tournament

Matches

Place Match

Final

Winner

External links
 King's Cup results RSSSF

King's Cup
International association football competitions hosted by Thailand
Cup